James Moore (born February 20, 1935) is an American former modern pentathlete who competed in the 1964 Summer Olympics and in the 1968 Summer Olympics.

References

1935 births
Living people
American male modern pentathletes
Modern pentathletes at the 1964 Summer Olympics
Modern pentathletes at the 1968 Summer Olympics
Olympic silver medalists for the United States in modern pentathlon
Medalists at the 1964 Summer Olympics
Pan American Games medalists in modern pentathlon
Pan American Games gold medalists for the United States
Modern pentathletes at the 1963 Pan American Games
Medalists at the 1963 Pan American Games
20th-century American people
21st-century American people